Blanding can refer to:

People
 Don Blanding (1894–1957), American poet
 Sarah Gibson Blanding (1898–1985), American educator and academic administrator
 Quin Blanding (born 1996), American football player

Places
 Blanding, Utah, United States
 Blanding, Illinois, United States
 Camp Blanding, Military reservation and training base in Florida

See also
Blandings Castle, fictional location of P. G. Wodehouse stories